The 2017 China Masters was a badminton tournament that took place at the Olympic Sports Center Xincheng Gymnasium in Changzhou, Jiangsu, China on 18–23 April 2017 and had a total purse of $150,000.

Tournament
The 2017 China Masters was the sixth tournament of the 2017 BWF Grand Prix Gold and Grand Prix and also part of the China Masters championships, which had been held since 2005. This tournament was organized by Chinese Badminton Association and sanctioned by the BWF.

Venue
This international tournament was held at the Changzhou Olympic Sports Centre in Changzhou, China.

Prize money
The total prize money for this tournament was US$150,000. Distribution of prize money was in accordance with BWF regulations.

Men's singles

Seeds

 Lin Dan (semifinals)
 Tian Houwei (champion)
 Qiao Bin (final)
 Huang Yuxiang (semifinals)
 Hsu Jen-hao (quarterfinals)
 Kanta Tsuneyama (quarterfinals)
 Lin Yu-hsien (second round)
 Zhao Junpeng (second round)

Finals

Top half

Section 1

Section 2

Section 3

Section 4

Bottom half

Section 5

Section 6

Section 7

Section 8

Women's singles

Seeds

 Chen Yufei (quarterfinals)
 Aya Ohori (champion)
 Ayumi Mine (first round)
 Lee Chia-hsin (first round)
 Saena Kawakami (final)
 Sung Shuo-yun (first round)
 Chen Su-yu (first round)
 Gao Fangjie (semifinals)

Finals

Top half

Section 1

Section 2

Bottom half

Section 3

Section 4

Men's doubles

Seeds

 Chen Hung-ling / Wang Chi-lin (champion)
 Huang Kaixiang / Wang Yilü (quarterfinals)
 Lu Ching-yao / Yang Po-han (second round)
 Liu Cheng / Zhang Nan (quarterfinals)
 Takuto Inoue / Yuki Kaneko (final)
 Berry Angriawan / Hardianto (semifinals)
 Chooi Kah Ming / Low Juan Shen (quarterfinals)
 Liao Kuan-hao / Lu Chia-pin (first round)

Finals

Top half

Section 1

Section 2

Bottom half

Section 3

Section 4

Women's doubles

Seeds

 Huang Dongping / Li Yinhui (semifinals)
 Tiara Rosalia Nuraidah / Rizki Amelia Pradipta (quarterfinals)
 Chiang Kai-hsin / Hung Shih-han (second round)
 Huang Yaqiong / Tang Jinhua (final)

Finals

Top half

Section 1

Section 2

Bottom half

Section 3

Section 4

Mixed doubles

Seeds

 Zhang Nan / Li Yinhui (semifinals)
 Hafiz Faisal / Shella Devi Aulia (semifinals)
 Yogendran Khrishnan /  Prajakta Sawant (withdrew)
 Liao Min-chun / Chen Hsiao-huan (final)
 Wang Yilü / Huang Dongping (champion)
 Edi Subaktiar / Gloria Emanuelle Widjaja (second round)
 Han Chengkai / Chen Lu (quarterfinals)
 Tan Qiang / Zhou Chaomin (quarterfinals)

Finals

Top half

Section 1

Section 2

Bottom half

Section 3

Section 4

References

External links 
 Tournament Link

China Masters
BWF Grand Prix Gold and Grand Prix
China Masters
China Masters
Sport in Jiangsu
China Masters